Platinum Dunes is an American production company founded in November 2001 by filmmakers Michael Bay, Brad Fuller, and Andrew Form. The company produces horror films, such as The Texas Chainsaw Massacre, The Purge, Friday the 13th, A Nightmare on Elm Street, Ouija, A Quiet Place, and A Quiet Place Part II. It also produces television series, such as Black Sails, The Last Ship, and Jack Ryan.

On October 7, 2009, Paramount Pictures announced a first-look deal with Platinum Dunes. With this, they plan to branch out of the horror genre into action and thrillers. On May 27, 2010, it was announced they would work on the reboot to the Teenage Mutant Ninja Turtles film series of the same name. In 2014, Platinum Dunes was named The Hollywood Reporters Producers of the Year. In 2015, the company was also named to The Hollywood Reporters 30 Most Powerful Film Producers in Hollywood. In 2018, Fuller and Form made an amicable split from Platinum Dunes to launch a new production company, Fully Formed Entertainment. In June 2022, Fuller returned to Platinum Dunes, with the company signing an overall first-look deal with Universal Pictures.

Filmography

Films

Television

See also
Michael Bay
Blumhouse Productions
Dark Castle Entertainment
Ghost House Pictures
Gold Circle Films
Twisted Pictures

References

2001 establishments in California
American companies established in 2001
Companies based in Santa Monica, California
Entertainment companies based in California
Film production companies of the United States
Mass media companies established in 2001
Michael Bay
Television production companies of the United States